Heidelinde Weis (born 17 September 1940 in Villach, Carinthia) is an Austrian actress.

Selected filmography
 I'm Marrying the Director (1960)
 Dead Woman from Beverly Hills (1964)
 Condemned to Sin (1964)
 Don't Tell Me Any Stories (1964)
  (1964)
 Aunt Frieda (1965)
 Serenade for Two Spies (1965)
 Tante Frieda (1965)
 Liselotte of the Palatinate (1966)
 Onkel Filser (1966)
 The Man Outside (1967)
  (1967)
 When Ludwig Goes on Manoeuvres (1967)
 Something for Everyone (1970)
   (1971, TV miniseries)
 Gospodjica (1980, TV film)
 Overheard (1984, TV film)
 The Black Forest Clinic (1985, TV series, 7 episodes)
  (2010, TV film)

References

External links
 

1940 births
Living people
Austrian film actresses
Austrian television actresses
People from Villach
20th-century Austrian actresses
21st-century Austrian actresses